Ronald James McGarry (born 5 December 1937 in Whitehaven) is a former professional footballer, who played centre forward for Whitehaven, Workington, Bolton Wanderers, Newcastle United, Barrow, South Coast United, Bulli, Balgownie Rangers and Gateshead.
McGarry played for Newcastle between 1963 and 1967, where he was nicknamed Cassius. He made 132 appearances and scored 46 goals.

Ron was famous for carrying printed cards with "Have goals will travel" on them, an idea he got from the 1960s TV western Have Gun Will Travel.

In 2009 The Fairs Club, a group of Newcastle United supporters, presented Ron with a football statuette with "Have Goals Will Travel" inscribed on it as thanks for his dedication to Newcastle United.

References

1937 births
Living people
Association football forwards
Barrow A.F.C. players
Bolton Wanderers F.C. players
English footballers
Newcastle United F.C. players
Gateshead A.F.C. players
Gateshead A.F.C. managers
Sportspeople from Whitehaven
English Football League players
Workington A.F.C. players
South Coast United players
Balgownie Rangers FC players
English football managers
Footballers from Cumbria